Carry On Screaming! is a 1966 British black comedy horror film, the twelfth in the series of 31 Carry On films (1958–1992). It was the last of the series to be made by Anglo-Amalgamated before the series moved to The Rank Organisation. Of the regular cast, it features Kenneth Williams, Jim Dale, Charles Hawtrey, Joan Sims, Bernard Bresslaw and Peter Butterworth. It also features Harry H. Corbett in his only series appearance and Fenella Fielding making her second and final appearance. Angela Douglas makes the second of her four Carry On appearances.  Carry On Screaming is a parody of the Hammer horror films, which were also popular at the time.

Plot 
The film opens in the Edwardian era in Hocombe Woods, where Doris Mann (Angela Douglas) and Albert Potter (Jim Dale) are courting. When Albert searches the woods for a peeping Tom, Doris is abducted by a monster named Oddbod (Tom Clegg), which leaves a finger behind. Albert, finding the finger, rushes to the police station and reports the matter to Detective Constable Slobotham (Peter Butterworth), who in turn tells his superior, the henpecked Detective Sergeant Sidney Bung (Harry H. Corbett), who has been investigating similar disappearances in the same woods.

After searching the woods for further clues, the group stumble across the eerie Bide-A-Wee Rest Home, and are shown to the sitting-room by the butler, Sockett (Bernard Bresslaw – a not dissimilar character to Lurch in The Addams Family). Sockett informs the mistress of the house, the seductive Valeria (Fenella Fielding), of their presence, and she in turn awakens her electrically charged brother, Dr. Orlando Watt (Kenneth Williams). Dr. Watt speaks to the three men, who are frightened from the house when Dr. Watt vanishes and re-appears when his electrical charge runs down.

The next day, Bung, Slobotham and Potter interview Dan Dann (Charles Hawtrey), a lavatory attendant who once worked at Bide-A-Wee as a gardener, but Dann is silenced by Oddbod before he can reveal anything. Meanwhile, the police scientist (Jon Pertwee) accidentally creates a second creature—Oddbod Junior (Billy Cornelius)—when subjecting Oddbod's finger to an electrical charge. After killing the scientist, Oddbod Junior makes his way to the mansion, where Valeria and Watt are turning people into mannequins (in the manner of House of Wax) to sell. Bung arrives at the house to investigate Dann's death, but becomes infatuated with Valeria instead.

The next day, Potter discovers Doris—in mannequin form—in a milliner's shop but no proof can be found that it really is Doris. Bung returns to the house and discovers evidence that links Valeria and Watt to the mannequin but remains oblivious. Believing him to be on their scent, Valeria and Watt use a potion to turn Bung into Mr. Hyde and order him to steal the mannequin for them. After recovering the next day, Bung and Slobotham decide to set a trap in Hocombe Woods, with Slobotham disguised as a woman for bait. Bung's sharp-tongued wife Emily (Joan Sims) follows, thinking Bung to be having an affair, and is captured by Oddbod Junior while Slobotham is captured by Oddbod. Bung, now teamed up with Potter, makes his way to the house whilst following their footprints.

After failing to dispose of Bung and Potter with a snake, the Oddbods are dispatched to deal with them. Bung and Potter are reunited with Slobotham and manage to return Doris to human form, but discover that Emily has been turned into a mannequin. A battle follows, in which Albert (in Mr. Hyde form) defeats the Oddbods. Dr. Watt menaces them with petrifying liquid but is threatened by the re-animated mummy of Rubbatiti, which has come alive following a lightning strike. Rubbatiti and Watt fall into a boiling vat in the cellar, killing them both. Albert and Doris marry some time later, only to discover that Bung, whose home lacks electricity, is unable to return his wife to human form, and is now living with Valeria.

Production
Production of the film ran from 10 January 1966 to 25 February 1966; it was filmed at Pinewood Studios and on location in Berkshire and Buckinghamshire.

Carry On Screaming was the second film in the series to have a sung main title theme. The theme song "Carry On Screaming" (film version only) was credited as "Anon" and was thought to have been sung by Jim Dale, who appears in the film. The singer is actually Ray Pilgrim, a session singer who sang for the Embassy label. A vinyl 45 rpm version of the song was also released in 1966 (Columbia DB 7972) by vocalist Boz Burrell, before he became bassist for the bands King Crimson and Bad Company. In the 2005 album What a Carry On, the theme was sung by Gary Williams, with the Royal Ballet Sinfonia conducted by Gavin Sutherland.

Deborah Kerr was initially offered the role of Valeria, but declined. The character is frequently referred to as a vampire, despite the film never stating her to be. Rather, she is more a parody of Morticia Addams.

The character of Orlando Watt was initially written as Valeria's father. This was changed at the request of actor Kenneth Williams, who wanted to play his own age (39), so that Orlando and Valeria are brother and sister in the finished version.

Charles Hawtrey was added to the cast at the eleventh hour, after American distributors specifically requested him, as he was such a hit and crowd-pleaser with audiences there. He replaced Sydney Bromley in the role of Dan Dann, in what would have been a minor role in the film. Hawtrey thereby has the unique distinction of being the only actor to have a leading credit in a Carry On for less than five minutes' screen time.

Harry H. Corbett replaced Sid James, due to Sid being committed to appearing as one of the robbers in the pantomime "Babes in the Wood "at the London Palladium, which ran until June 1966.

Cast
 Harry H. Corbett as Detective Sergeant Sidney Bung
 Kenneth Williams as Dr Orlando Watt
 Jim Dale as Albert Potter
 Charles Hawtrey as Dan Dann
 Fenella Fielding as Valeria Watt
 Joan Sims as Emily Bung
 Angela Douglas as Doris Mann
 Bernard Bresslaw as Sockett
 Peter Butterworth as Detective Constable Slobotham
 Jon Pertwee as Doctor Fettle
 Michael Ward as Mr Vivian
 Tom Clegg as Oddbod
 Billy Cornelius as Oddbod Junior
 Norman Mitchell as Cabby
 Frank Thornton as Mr Jones
 Frank Forsyth as Desk Sergeant
 Anthony Sagar as Policeman
 Sally Douglas as Girl
 Marianne Stone as Mrs Parker
 Denis Blake as Rubbatiti
 Gerald Thomas as Voice of Oddbod Junior (uncredited)

Filming and locations

 Filming dates: 10 January – 25 February 1966

Interiors:
 Pinewood Studios, Buckinghamshire

Exteriors:
 Windsor, Berkshire
 Fulmer, Buckinghamshire

References

Sources

External links
 
 
 Carry On Screaming at The Whippit Inn
 
 
 
 Ray Pilgrim recalls the recording of the “Carry On Screaming” title song

1966 films
1966 horror films
1960s historical comedy films
1960s comedy horror films
1960s parody films
British comedy horror films
British historical horror films
British parody films
1960s English-language films
Screaming!
British detective films
Films directed by Gerald Thomas
Films produced by Peter Rogers
Films set in the 1900s
Films shot at Pinewood Studios
Films shot in Berkshire
Films shot in Buckinghamshire
British haunted house films
Mannequins in films
Police detective films
Films with screenplays by Talbot Rothwell
1960s historical horror films
1966 comedy films
1960s British films